Benton Hall, built in 1907~1908 as an administration building, dedicated in 1909, was used as such until the new Administration Building was completed in 1956. It housed the music department, and the auditorium seating 1200 was used for small group meetings as it can accommodate only a fraction of the present enrollment, and total Miami meeting. Currently, Hall Auditorium houses the College of Engineering and Computing office as well as the Computer Science and Software Engineering department.

History

In 1969 a building designed primarily for use by the Department of Psychology was given the name Benton Hall and the older structure renamed Hall Auditorium, after the Miami’s fifth president, John W. Hall.
For many years, the old Benton Hall served not only the auditorium, but also the university administrative offices. The president, dean, and business manager had offices on the second floor; the registrar and Miami Student newspaper had offices on the ground floor. Upon completion of the new Administration Building (Roudebush Hall) in 1956, the old Benton Hall became the headquarters for the Music Department. In its early years of use, the building was known simply as the “Administration Building” or as the “Auditorium”.

Design and construction

The new Benton Hall on the northeast corner of High Street and Tallawanda Avenue was to provide facilities for the Department of Psychology. It includes 2 lecture halls, 3 classrooms, 5 instructional laboratories, a library, 114 other teaching and research facilities, 19 supporting rooms and shops, and 33 offices. Benton Hall now houses the College of Engineering and Computing and the Department of Computer Science and Software Engineering. The College of Engineering and Computing, formerly the School of Engineering and Applied Science, was created in 1959 to provide professionally oriented programs within Miami's liberal arts tradition. The college currently has approximately two thousand majors in computing and engineering on three campuses: Oxford, Hamilton, and Middletown. The college offers bachelor's and master's degrees.

Guy Potter Benton

Benton Hall is named for Guy Potter Benton, president of Miami University from 1902 to 1911. One of the Miami's greatest presidents, the 11th president Guy Potter Benton was born in Kenton Ohio on May 26, 1856. Before coming to Miami in 1902, Benton served as superintendent of schools in Fort Scott, Kansas, professor of history and sociology at Baker University, and president of Upper Iowa University. As Miami University’s president, Benton presided over the beginning of Miami's evolution from a small rural institution into a thriving modern university. The year Benton became president there were but five buildings on the campus and the total student enrollment was 124. When he resigned nine years later, the student enrollment had increased to more than 1,200. Many of the new students were women enrolled at the Normal School which opened during Benton's tenure.

By 1911, Miami's income had grown to approximately a quarter of a million dollars, and seven modern buildings had been erected in response to a constantly growing University constituency. 
      
President Benton was also largely responsible for the defeat of the Lybarger Bill, one of the greatest threats ever posed to Miami's existence as a university. Introduced in the Ohio Legislature in 1906 and promoted by Ohio State President William Oxley Thompson (a former Miami University president), the Lybarger Bill would have reduced Miami to the status of a teacher's college. Benton actively and successfully lobbied legislators to defeat the Bill.

Following his departure from Miami, Benton was president of the University of Vermont from 1911 to 1917, and he served with the American Expeditionary Force in Europe from 1917 to 1919. In 1921 Benton became the first president of the University of the Philippines. Ill health forced his retirement three years later and he died in Minneapolis on June 28, 1927. In accordance with his wishes, Guy Porter Benton was buried in the Oxford Cemetery.

References

External links 

Buildings and structures of Miami University